Matjaž Trbovc (born 11 September 1989) is a Slovenia judoka.

He is the silver medallist of the 2018 Judo Grand Prix Tunis in the -60 kg category.

References

External links
 

1989 births
Living people
Slovenian male judoka
Judoka at the 2015 European Games
Judoka at the 2019 European Games
European Games competitors for Slovenia
21st-century Slovenian people